The Democratic candidates in the 2016 United States presidential election hold a wide variety of stances on issues related to domestic and foreign policy and their political ideological views.

Domestic policy

Foreign policy

Political ideologies

Note that some of these terms are self-identifiers (in quotation marks): the views linked to may not adequately represent all of their policy stances.

See also 
 Democratic Party presidential candidates, 2016
 Political positions of the Republican Party presidential primary candidates, 2016

References 

Democratic Party
2016 United States Democratic presidential primaries